is a Japanese professional wrestler, currently working for the Japanese professional wrestling promotion DDT Pro-Wrestling (DDT). Takao has taken part in every edition of DDT's flagship annual event, Peter Pan, where he had a series of 13 straight victories.

Professional wrestling career

Independent circuit (2009–present)
Takao made his professional wrestling debut for DDT Pro-Wrestling at Ryōgoku Peter Pan on August 23, 2009, where he teamed up with Keisuke Ishii and Yukihiro Abe to defeat Gota Ihashi, Shigehiro Irie, and Tomokazu Taniguchi in a six-man tag team match. He participated in one of the longest matches in professional wrestling history, a 108-man battle royal at Tenka Sanbun no Kei: New Year's Eve Special, a cross-over event held between Big Japan Pro Wrestling, DDT and Kaientai Dojo from December 31, 2009, competing against other infamous wrestlers such as Great Kojika, Taka Michinoku, Kenny Omega, Abdullah Kobayashi, and the winner of the match, Jun Kasai. He is known for his tenure with other promotions such as Ice Ribbon, where he worked his latest match on May 29, 2020 at Ice Ribbon Hiragi Kurumi 20th Birthday And Debut 10th Anniversary ~ Walnut Anniversary, where he teamed up with Hiragi Kurumi in a losing effort to Mochi Miyagi and Shigehiro Irie in an intergender tag team match. Takao won the AJPW World Junior Heavyweight Championship at Ryōgoku Peter Pan 2016, another cross-over event held by DDT and All Japan Pro Wrestling from August 28, 2016, where he defeated Hikaru Sato. On May 4, 2019, Takao worked a match for WWNLive, at WWNLive Mercury Rising, where he teamed up with fellow Damnation stable members Daisuke Sasaki and Tetsuya Endo to defeat The Skulk (Adrian Alanis, A. R. Fox and Leon Ruff). Takao worked for Dragon Gate as well, in another cross-over event also hosted by DDT, the Dragon Gate/DDT Dramatic Dream Gate Returns from June 5, 2012, where he teamed up with Sanshiro Takagi to defeat Kotoka and Masaaki Mochizuki.

DDT Pro-Wrestling (2009–present)
Takao had his Luchas de apuestas match at DDT Into The Fight 2011 on February 27, where he defeated Hikaru Sato in a hair vs hair match. He was one of the inaugural KO-D 6-Man Tag Team Champions alongside Keisuke Ishii and Shigehiro Irie as part of the Team Dream Futures stable after defeating Team Shiro (Akito, Makoto Oishi and Sanshiro Takagi) in the finals of a four-team tournament which culminated at Osaka 24 Ward Tour: Nishi Ward on January 12, 2013. He is also a former KO-D Tag Team Champion, title which he won by teaming up with one of his stablemates from Damnation, Daisuke Sasaki at Into The Fight 2019, on March 21, after defeating Moonlight Express (Mike Bailey and Mao). The actual first time when he won the titles was at DDT Judgement 2012 on March 11, where he teamed up with former fellow New World Japan stable member Sanshiro Takagi to defeat Crying Wolf (Yuji Hino and Yasu Urano). Takao is a former multuple time Ironman Heavymetalweight Champion, lastly winning it in the first day of the D-Oh Grand Prix 2019 In Shin-Kiba, on December 7, 2018, where he defeated Tetsuya Endo in a match of the tournament's block B.

Championships and accomplishments
All Japan Pro Wrestling
World Junior Heavyweight Championship (1 time)
'''DDT Pro-Wrestling
Ironman Heavymetalweight Championship (4 times)
KO-D Tag Team Championship (2 times) – with Sanshiro Takagi and Daisuke Sasaki
KO-D 6-Man Tag Team Championship (8 times, current) – with Keisuke Ishii and Shigehiro Irie (6), Tetsuya Endo and Mad Paulie (1), and Tetsuya Endo and Yuji Hino (1)
World Ōmori Championship (1 time, current)
Young Drama Cup (2010)

Luchas de Apuestas record

Peter Pan record

References

External links

1988 births
Living people
Japanese male professional wrestlers
World Junior Heavyweight Champions (AJPW)
Ironman Heavymetalweight Champions
21st-century professional wrestlers
KO-D 6-Man Tag Team Champions
KO-D Tag Team Champions